David Hermann Engel (22 January 1816 – 3 May 1877) was a German organist and composer.

Life 
Born in Neuruppin, after his first organ lessons with Friedrich Wilke in Neu-Ruppin, Engel studied with Friedrich Schneider in Dessau and Adolf Friedrich Hesse in Breslau. In 1841, he went to Berlin, where he worked as a music and singing teacher. Some of his works appeared in print here. His acquaintance with  led him to study older Italian church music. In 1848, Engel was elected organist at the Merseburg Cathedral.

Engel is considered the "discoverer" and patron of the organ builder Friedrich Ladegast.

Engel died in Merseburg at the age of 61.

Awards 
 Engel received the goldene Medaille für Kunst und Wissenschaft from the Prussian King for the publication of the Choralbuch zur gottesdienstlichen Feier für Kirche und Haus.

Work 
 Choralbuch (with interludes) zur gottesdienstlichen Feier für Kirche und Haus Op. 10, Berlin 1844 
 Der 81. Psalm Op. 11, Berlin 1847 
 Der 61. Psalm Op. 12, Eisleben 1852
 Zehn Orgelstücke Op. 15, Erfurt 1855 
 Winfried und die heilige Eiche bei Geismar Op. 20
 Geistliche Melodien aus dem 17. Jahrhundert Op. 24, Leipzig 1857
 Zionsharfe Op. 26, Leipzig 1860
 Weihnachts-Hymne Op. 37, Leipzig 1872

References

Further reading 
 Autobiography, in Galerie berühmter Pädagogen, verdienter Schulmänner, Jugend- und Volksschriftsteller und Componisten aus der Gegenwart in Biographien und biographischen Skizzen, 1 (1859), 5

External links 

 
 
 
 Engel, David Hermann: Beitrag zur Geschichte des Orgelbauwesens: eine Denkschrift zur Einweihung der durch Herrn Friedrich Ladegast erbauten großen Dom-Orgel zu Merseburg, nebst Disposition derselben (in German) Körner 1855

German classical organists
German classical composers
19th-century hymnwriters
1816 deaths
1877 deaths
People from Neuruppin